Edward Patterson (born November 14, 1972) is a Canadian former professional ice hockey player. He played 68 games in the National Hockey League with the Pittsburgh Penguins between 1993 and 1996. The rest of his career, which lasted from 1992 to 2007, was spent in the minor leagues and then in Europe. Patterson is currently the head coach of the Kamloops Storm of the Kootenay International Junior Hockey League.

Biography
Patterson was born in Delta, British Columbia. As a youth, he played in the 1986 Quebec International Pee-Wee Hockey Tournament with a minor ice hockey team from North Delta, British Columbia.

He played three seasons of junior hockey in the Western Hockey League and was drafted by the Pittsburgh Penguins. He turned professional in 1992 with the Cleveland Lumberjacks. Patterson would play in the minor leagues, with a few stints with the Penguins, until 2000, when he moved to Europe. He played six seasons in Europe before ending his career in 2007.

Career statistics

Regular season and playoffs

References

External links
 

1972 births
Living people
Canadian expatriate ice hockey players in England
Canadian expatriate ice hockey players in Wales
Canadian ice hockey right wingers
Cardiff Devils players
Cincinnati Cyclones (IHL) players
Cleveland Lumberjacks players
Eisbären Berlin players
Grand Rapids Griffins (IHL) players
Ice hockey people from British Columbia
Kamloops Blazers players
London Knights (UK) players
People from Delta, British Columbia
Pittsburgh Penguins draft picks
Pittsburgh Penguins players
Seattle Thunderbirds players
Swift Current Broncos players
Canadian expatriate ice hockey players in Germany